Salicornia blackiana, synonym Sarcocornia blackiana, commonly known as thick-head glasswort, is a species of succulent halophytic shrub.  It is widespread in southern and western Australia, including Tasmania.  Its preferred habitats are estuaries, swamps and periodically waterlogged saline areas.

Description
It grows as an erect or decumbent perennial herb with succulent, stem-like leaves, growing up to 0.8 m in height.  It is very similar to the better known beaded glasswort but is a larger plant and differs in having a thicker fruiting spike, 4–9 mm in diameter, and seeds with blunt hairs or papillae.

References

External links 

blackiana
Flora of Tasmania
Flora of New South Wales
Flora of Victoria (Australia)
Flora of South Australia
Eudicots of Western Australia
Halophytes
Caryophyllales of Australia
Barilla plants